The 2017 Asia Rugby Championship division tournaments refers to the divisions played within the annual international rugby union tournament for the Asian region. The Asia Rugby Championship (ARC) replaced the Asian Five Nations tournament in 2015. The main tournament is now contested by the top three teams in Asia. The other national teams in Asia compete in three divisions.

Teams
The teams involved in the division tournaments, with their world rankings prior to the competition in brackets:

Division 1
  (41) 
  (54)
  (57)
  (72)

Division 2
  (59)
  (67)
  (76)
  (80)

Division 3

West
  (94)
  (NA)
  (NA)

East
  (73)
  (99)
  (81)
  (NA)

Division 1

The Division 1 tournament will be held in Ipoh, Malaysia. All times are Malaysia Time (UTC+8)

For the 2017 edition of the tournament, Division 1 doubles as part of qualification for the 2019 Rugby World Cup. All teams that do not win Division 1 will be eliminated from World Cup qualification.

Table

Fixtures

Round 1

Round 2

Round 3

Division 2

The Division 2 tournament were held at Taipei Municipal Stadium in Taipei, Taiwan. As the champion, Singapore were promoted to 2018 Asia Rugby Championship Division 1.

Fixtures

Semi-finals

3rd-place final

Final

Division 3 West

The Division 3 West tournament will be held in Tashkent, Uzbekistan.

Fixtures

Division 3 East

The Division 3CE tournament was scheduled to be held on 1–4 November 2017 at Chao Anouvong Stadium in Vientiane, Laos, with four teams competing:

The tournament was cancelled due to the unavailability of both Guam and Indonesia.

References

2017
2017 in Asian rugby union
2017 rugby union tournaments for national teams